Eppishausen is a municipality in the district of Unterallgäu in Swabia in Bavaria, Germany. It has a municipal association with Kirchheim in Schwaben, where the place of administration is centralized.

Localities 

 Aufhof
 Könghausen

References

Unterallgäu